Scared Sacred is an independent film produced in 2004 and released in 2006 by director Velcrow Ripper.

Scared Sacred is a feature-length documentary that takes viewers to many of the places in the world that have experienced great suffering in recent years including Bhopal, Hiroshima, Israel and Palestine. The film portrays Ripper's own search for meaning, and communicates stories of hope in spite of oppression.

Co-produced by the National Film Board of Canada and Producers on Davie Pictures, Scared Sacred received a Genie Award for Best Documentary.

A second film by Velcrow Ripper, Fierce Light builds on where Scared Sacred ends. Fierce Light is about spiritual activists.

References

External links
 
 Official Page
 Watch Scared Sacred at NFB.ca
 Scared Sacred, an interview with ascent magazine.
Velcrow Ripper on "Scared Sacred" (Video interview from Capturing Reality: The Art of Documentary)

National Film Board of Canada documentaries
Canadian documentary films
2004 films
Best Documentary Film Genie and Canadian Screen Award winners
Documentary films about spirituality
2004 documentary films
Films directed by Velcrow Ripper
2000s Canadian films